The 2012 United States House of Representatives elections in Illinois were held on Tuesday, November 6, 2012 to elect the 18 U.S. representatives from the state, one from each of the state's 18 congressional districts, a loss of one seat following the 2010 United States Census. The elections coincided with the elections of other federal and state offices, including a quadrennial presidential election. Primary elections were held on March 20, 2012.

Republicans struggled after a strong showing in 2010, losing a total of five seats, one via redistricting, and four via loses by incumbents. Joe Walsh, Bob Dold, Judy Biggert, and Bobby Schilling were all defeated in their bids for re-election. Walsh, Dold, and Schilling had all been elected during the wave year of 2010.

Redistricting
A redistricting bill was introduced to the Illinois General Assembly by members of the Democratic Party in May 2011. Although Representatives are not required to live within their districts, the new map drew the homes of at least five Republican incumbents into districts where they would have to run against other Republicans, and others into districts which strongly favor Democrats.

After an amendment which modified the 13th and 15th districts was passed with Republican support, the new map was passed by the Illinois House of Representatives on May 30, 2011 and the Senate on May 31. Governor Pat Quinn, a Democrat, signed the map into law on June 24. Republican members of the congressional delegation planned to mount a legal challenge.

Overview

District 1

The 1st district, which has been represented by Democrat Bobby Rush since 1993, had seen a decline in population and so now extends into the Chicago suburbs and rural areas of Will County.

Democratic primary

Candidates

Nominee
 Bobby Rush, incumbent U.S. Representative

Eliminated in primary
 Harold Bailey 
 Raymond Lodato, lecturer in public policy at the University of Chicago 
 Clifford Russell Jr., police officer 
 Jordan Sims, political commentator for an online newspaper 
 Fred Smith, program director for a youth care agency

Endorsements

Primary results

Republican primary

Candidates

Nominee
 Donald Peloquin, Mayor of Blue Island

Eliminated in primary
 Frederick Collins, police officer and 2010 candidate for Cook County Sheriff 
 Jimmy Lee Tillman II, producer

Endorsements

Primary results

General election

Endorsements

Results

District 2

The new 2nd district stretches from Kankakee County, through Will County and to Chicago. Democrat Jesse Jackson, Jr., who had represented the 2nd district since 1999, sought re-election.

Democratic primary

Candidates

Nominee
 Jesse Jackson Jr., incumbent U.S. Representative

Eliminated in primary
Debbie Halvorson, former U.S. Representative

Endorsements

Polling

Primary results

Republican primary
Republican Adam Kinzinger, who was first elected to represent the 11th district in 2010 and now lives in the 2nd district, sought re-election in the 16th district.

Candidates

Nominee
 Brian Woodworth, associate professor at Olivet Nazarene University

Eliminated in primary
 James Taylor Sr., newspaper publisher

Declined
Adam Kinzinger, incumbent U.S. Representative for the 11th district

Endorsements

Primary results

Independents
Marcus Lewis, postal worker

General election

Endorsements

Polling

Results

Aftermath
Jesse Jackson, Jr. resigned his seat in the 112th Congress on November 21, 2012, and also resigned his seat in the 113th Congress on the same day. As a result, no one was seated in the 113th Congress for the 2nd congressional District and a Special Election was called for April, 2013, to fill the vacancy.

District 3

The 3rd district, which has been represented by Democrat Dan Lipinski since 2005, now extends to Bridgeport, Chicago and Lockport, Will County. Lipinski sought re-election.

Democratic primary
Insurance executive and health care activist John Atkinson was expected to challenge incumbent Lipinski, and raised over $535,000 in the first quarter of 2011, but no longer lives in Lipinski's district. Atkinson had considered instead running in the 11th district, but suspended his campaign on June 14, 2011.

Candidates

Nominee
 Dan Lipinski, incumbent U.S. Representative

Eliminated in primary
 Farah Baqai, police officer

Withdrawn
 John Atkinson, Insurance executive and health care activist

Endorsements

Primary results

Republican primary

Candidates

Nominee
 Richard Grabowski, manufacturing company supervisor

Eliminated in primary
 Jim Falvey, attorney
 Arthur J. Jones, insurance sales representative

Endorsements

Primary results

General election

Endorsements

Results

District 4

The 4th district, which has been represented by Democrat Luis Gutiérrez since 1993, was extended to incorporate Gutiérrez's new home in Portage Park.

Democratic primary

Candidates

Nominee
Luis Gutiérrez, incumbent U.S. Representative

Eliminated in primary
Jorge Zavala, teacher with the City Colleges of Chicago

Primary results

Republican primary
Héctor Concepción, a former director of the Puerto Rican chamber of commerce, had been removed from the ballot by the Illinois Board of Elections in January 2012, but since refiled and challenged Gutiérrez as the Republican nominee in the general election.

Candidates

Nominee
Héctor Concepción, former director of the Puerto Rican chamber of commerce

Primary results

General election

Endorsements

Results

District 5

The 5th district, which has been represented by Democrat Mike Quigley since 2009, was redrawn to include Franklin Park, Elmwood Park, Hinsdale, Oak Brook, River Grove, Schiller Park and parts of Melrose Park, Stone Park and the North Side of Chicago. Quigley sought re-election.

Democratic primary

Candidates

Nominee
 Mike Quigley, incumbent U.S. Representative

Primary results

Republican primary

Candidates

Nominee
Dan Schmitt, self-employed

Primary results

Green primary

Candidates

Nominee
Nancy Wade, community activist

General election

Endorsements

Results

District 6

The 6th district, which has been represented by Republican Peter Roskam since 2007, is one of two districts which were expected to remain strongly favorable to Republicans, although it has been redrawn to include Algonquin, Barrington, Cary, Downers Grove, Glen Ellyn, Lake in the Hills, Lake Zurich, Palatine, South Elgin, West Chicago, Westmont and Wheaton.

Republican primary

Candidates

Nominee
Peter Roskam, incumbent U.S. Representative

Primary results

Democratic primary

Candidates

Nominee
 Leslie Coolidge, Certified Public Accountant and former partner at KPMG

Eliminated in primary
 Geoffrey Petzel, small business owner 
 Maureen E. Yates, retired businesswoman

Disqualified
 Tim Ritter, graduate student at the University of Illinois at Chicago

Endorsements

Primary results

Independents
Khizar Jafri, a traffic analyst, ran as an Independent.

General election

Endorsements

Results

District 7

The 7th district, which has been represented by Democrat Danny K. Davis since 1997, was redrawn to include parts of LaGrange Park and Westchester. Davis sought re-election.

Democratic primary

Candidates

Nominee
 Danny Davis, incumbent U.S. Representative

Eliminated in primary
 Jacques A. Conway, pastor and retired police officer

Endorsements

Primary results

Republican primary

Candidates

Nominee
Rita Zak

General election

Endorsements

Results

District 8

Republican Joe Walsh, who was first elected to represent the 8th district in 2010, ran for re-election despite no longer living within the redrawn boundaries of the district.  Walsh had initially decided to run in the redrawn 14th district.

Republican primary
Walsh defeated write-in candidate Robert Canfield, a business owner who had planned to challenge him in the Republican primary before being removed from the ballot by the Illinois Board of Elections.

Candidates

Nominee
Joe Walsh, incumbent U.S. Representative

Eliminated in primary
Robert Canfield, business owner

Withdrawn
Rick Veenstra, DuPage County assistant state attorney

Disqualified
Rich Evans, accountant

Declined
David Harris, state representative
Craig Johnson, Mayor of Elk Grove Village
Andrew Palomo, businessman 
Darlene Ruscitti, DuPage County Superintendent of Education

Primary results

Democratic primary

Candidates

Nominee
 Tammy Duckworth, Iraq veteran, former official in the U.S. Department of Veterans Affairs and candidate for the 6th district in 2006

Eliminated in primary
 Raja Krishnamoorthi, former deputy state treasurer and candidate for Illinois Comptroller in 2010

Declined
Melissa Bean, former U.S. Representative (endorsed Krishnamoorthi)

Endorsements

Primary results

General election

Campaign
Walsh and Duckworth scheduled four debates. The first was held on May 12, 2012 on CLTV, the second on September 14 in West Dundee at Heritage Fest, the third on October 9 on WCPT and WIND at the Meadows Club in Rolling Meadows, open to 8th district residents. The fourth was held on October 18 on WTTW’s Chicago Tonight.

Endorsements

Polling

Predictions

Results

District 9

Democrat Jan Schakowsky, who had represented the 9th district since 1999, sought re-election.

Robert Dold, who was first elected to represent the 10th district in 2010, lives in the new 9th district, but sought re-election in the 10th.

Democratic primary

Candidates

Nominee
Jan Schakowsky, incumbent U.S. Representative

Eliminated in primary
 Simon Ribeiro, high school teacher and Green Party nominee for this seat in 2010

Endorsements

Primary results

Republican primary

Candidates

Nominee
Timothy Wolfe,

Withdrawn
Ron Wallace, Niles Township Republican Committeeman

Declined
Robert Dold, incumbent U.S. Representative for the 10th district

Primary results

General election

Endorsements

Results

District 10

Bob Dold, who was first elected to represent the 10th district in 2010, sought re-election. Dold no longer lives in the redrawn district, but would move into the district if he won re-election.

Republican primary

Candidates

Nominee
Bob Dold, incumbent U.S. Representative

Primary results

Democratic primary

Candidates

Nominee
 Brad Schneider, management consultant

Eliminated in primary
 Vivek Bavda, attorney 
 Ilya Sheyman, community organizer 
 John Tree, business executive and Colonel in the U.S. Air Force Reserve

Withdrawn
Bob McKenzie, lawyer

Disqualified
 Aloys Rutagwibira, mathematician and basketball coach

Declined
Susan Garrett, state senator
Carol Sente, state representative

Endorsements

Primary results

General election

Endorsements

Polling

Predictions

Results

District 11

The newly drawn 11th district is the successor to the old 13th District, which has been represented by Republican Judy Biggert since 1999. While the reconfigured district contains half of Biggert's former territory, it was made significantly more Democratic than before. It now includes the Democratic-leaning areas of Joliet and Aurora. Biggert's home in Hinsdale was drawn into the 6th District, but she sought reelection in this district.

Republican primary
Biggert won the primary against nominal write-in opposition from Harris.

Candidates

Nominee
Judy Biggert, incumbent U.S. Representative

Eliminated in primary
Diane Harris, notary public

Disqualified
Jack Cunningham, Kane County Clerk

Declined
Chris Balkema, member of the Grundy County Board
Richard Irvin, Aurora alderman
Chris Lauzen, state senator (running for Kane County Board Chairman)

Endorsements

Primary results

Democratic primary

Candidates

Nominee
Bill Foster, former U.S. Representative

Eliminated in primary
 James Hickey, president of the Orland Fire Protection District
 Juan Thomas, former Aurora Township clerk

Declined
John Atkinson, Insurance executive and health care activist
Linda Chapa LaVia, state representative
Linda Holmes, state senator

Endorsements

Primary results

General election

Endorsements

Polling

Predictions

Results

District 12

Democrat Jerry Costello, who had represented the 12th district since 1988, decided to retire rather than run for re-election.

Democratic primary

Candidates

Nominee
 Brad Harriman, St. Clair County Regional Superintendent

Eliminated in primary
 Kenneth Wiezer, retired carpenter

Withdrawn
 Chris Miller, Illinois political director of the Truman National Security Project and Iraq War U.S. Army veteran

Declined
 John Baricevic, St. Clair County Chief Judge 
John E. Bradley, state representative
Ann Callis, Madison County Chief Judge 
James Clayborne, Jr., state senator
Jerry Costello, incumbent U.S. Representative
Jerry Costello II, state representative and Jerry Costello's eldest son
Bill Haine, state senator
Tom Holbrook, state representative  
Jay C. Hoffman, former state representative
Brendan Kelly, St. Clair County State's Attorney
Mark Kern, St. Clair County Board Chairman 
Matt Melucci, Madison County Circuit Clerk
Sheila Simon, incumbent Lieutenant Governor

Campaign
Miller ended his campaign in February 2012 and endorsed Harriman (but remained on the primary ballot).

Endorsements

Primary results

In May 2012, however, Harriman dropped out of the race because of an illness; that left the decision of whom to name as a replacement candidate up to a committee that included the 12 Democratic county chairmen in the district and Rep. Costello. The committee unanimously selected Major General (ret.) and Adjutant General of Illinois William Enyart as the replacement nominee on June 23.

Republican primary

Candidates

Nominee
 Jason Plummer, chairman of the Madison County Republican Party and nominee for Lieutenant Governor in 2010

Eliminated in primary
 Rodger Cook, former Mayor of Belleville
 Theresa Kormos, nurse and candidate for this seat in 2010

Disqualified
 Teri Newman, businesswoman and nominee for this seat in 2010

Declined
Mike Bost, state representative

Endorsements

Primary results

Green primary
Paula Bradshaw, a registered nurse, ran as the Green Party nominee.

Independents
Retha Daugherty, a small-business owner and resident of Carbondale, had announced her intentions to be on the ballot as an Independent candidate, but had to drop her bid in April 2012 because of a change in state election law.

General election

Endorsements

Polling

Predictions

Results

District 13

The new 13th is the successor to the old 15th District, represented by Republican Tim Johnson since 2001.

Republican primary

Candidates

Nominee
 Tim Johnson, incumbent U.S. Representative

Eliminated in primary
 Michael Firsching, veterinarian
 Frank Metzger, retired ironworker

Endorsements

Primary results

Republican convention
Although Johnson won the primary, in April 2012, he chose to retire rather than seek re-election. A convention was held on May 19, 2012, to choose a replacement nominee. The 14 GOP county chairmen in the district unanimously selected Rodney Davis as the party nominee.

Candidates

Nominee
 Rodney L. Davis, aide to U.S. Representative John Shimkus

Eliminated at the convention
 Jerry Clarke, chief of staff to U.S. Representative Randy Hultgren and Johnson's former chief of staff
 Erika Harold, lawyer and 2003 Miss America 
 Kathy Wassink, businesswoman.

Declined
Jason Barickman, state representative
Phil Bloomer, Johnson's communications director
Bill Brady, state senator and nominee for Governor in 2010
Dan Brady, state representative
Adam Brown, state representative
Sam McCann, state senator
Kyle McCarter, state senator 
Duane Noland, former state senator
Chapin Rose, state representative
Mark Shelden, Johnson's current chief of staff
Mike Tate, CEO of the Independent Insurance Agents of Illinois and former state Representative
Jim Watson, state representative

Democratic primary

Candidates

Nominee
David Gill, physician and nominee for the 15th district in 2004, 2006 and 2010

Eliminated in primary
 Matt Goetten, Greene County State attorney

Withdrawn
James Gray, retired school administrator

Declined
Mike Frerichs, state senator 
Jay Hoffman, former state representative
Mark N. Lee, labor lawyer
Brendan McGinty, Champaign County Board member

Endorsements

Primary results

Independent
John Hartman, a medical technology company CFO, ran as an independent candidate.

General election

Endorsements

Polling

 With Jerry Clarke

 With Generic Democratic

Results

District 14

The redrawn 14th district includes McHenry County and parts of DuPage, Kane, Kendall, Lake, and Will counties. Republican Randy Hultgren, who was first elected to represent the 14th district in 2010, ran for re-election.

Republican primary

Candidates

Nominee
Randy Hultgren, incumbent U.S. Representative

Declined
Joe Walsh, incumbent U.S. Representative for the 8th district

Primary results

Democratic primary
Bill Foster, a Democrat who represented the 14th district from 2008 until 2011, decided to run in the 11th district in 2012, although some Illinois General Assembly leaders had hoped he would run in the 14th district, where his home is located.

Candidates

Nominee
 Dennis Anderson, public health researcher and International Breast Cancer Research Foundation trustee

Eliminated in primary
 Jonathan Farnick, computer support technician

Declined
Jack Franks, state representative 
Frank McClatchey, former McHenry alderman and former chairman of the McHenry County

Endorsements

Primary results

General election

Endorsements

Results

District 15

Republican John Shimkus, who had represented the now-obsolete 19th district since 2003 and represented the 20th district (eliminated after redistricting following the 2000 Census) from 1997 until 2003, sought re-election in the new 15th district.

Republican primary

Candidates

Nominee
John Shimkus, incumbent U.S. Representative

Primary results

Democratic primary

Candidates

Nominee
Angela Michael, retired nurse

Primary results

General election

Endorsements

Results

District 16

In redistricting, the 16th district was moved south to incorporate Livingston and Iroquois Counties and parts of Ford County. Republican U.S. Representatives Adam Kinzinger, who had represented the 11th district since January 2011, and Don Manzullo, who had represented the 16th district since 1993, sought re-election in the new 16th district.

Republican primary

Candidates

Nominee
 Adam Kinzinger, incumbent U.S. Representative from the 11th district

Eliminated in primary
 Don Manzullo, incumbent U.S. Representative

Declined
Frank Gambino, majority leader of the Winnebago County Board however, he announced in September 2011 that he would instead run for the Illinois Senate.

Endorsements

Polling

Primary results

Democratic primary

Candidates

Nominee
Wanda Rohl, social worker

Independents
Bronco Bojovic, a businessman, had planned to run as an Independent candidate but dropped out of the race in February 2012.

General election

Endorsements

Results

District 17

The 17th district, based in Rock Island and Moline, was extended to include most of Rockford and the more Democratic areas of Peoria and Tazewell County, thereby making it more favorable to Democrats. Republican Bobby Schilling, who had represented the district since January 2011, ran for re-election.

Republican primary

Candidates

Nominee
Bobby Schilling, incumbent U.S. Representative

Primary results

Democratic primary

Candidates

Nominee
 Cheri Bustos, East Moline alderwoman

Eliminated in primary
 Greg Aguilar, director of multicultural services at Augustana College 
 George Gaulrapp, Mayor of Freeport

Withdrawn
Eric Reyes, attorney

Declined
Mike Boland, former state representative
Phil Hare, former U.S. Representative
Dave Koehler, state senator
Porter McNeill, activist
Mark Schwiebert, former Mayor of Rock Island

Endorsements

Primary results

General election

Endorsements

Polling

Predictions

Results

District 18

Republican Aaron Schock, who had represented the 18th district since 2009, ran for and won re-election. The district was one of two which were expected to remain strongly favorable to Republicans. Peoria's more Democratic southern portion was shifted to the 17th District, and was replaced by the heavily Republican Bloomington-Normal and Quincy areas.

Republican primary

Candidates

Nominee
Aaron Schock, incumbent U.S. Representative

Disqualified
Darrel Miller, farmer but was removed from the ballot by the Illinois Board of Elections in February 2012.

Primary results

Democratic primary

Candidates

Nominee
 Steve Waterworth, farmer and former master sergeant in the Air Force and Air National Guard

Eliminated in primary
 Matthew Woodmancy, restaurant manager

Primary results

General election

Endorsements

Results

References

External links
Illinois State Board of Elections
Official candidate list, Primary Election
Official candidate list, General Election
Find your current district by address or zip+4
Find your new district by address or map
Vote 2012: Meet the Candidates, ABC 7 Chicago, video statements and questionnaire answers
Candidate issue positions at On the Issues
United States House of Representatives elections in Illinois, 2012 at Ballotpedia
Illinois U.S. House from OurCampaigns.com
Campaign contributions for U.S. Congressional races in Illinois from OpenSecrets
Outside spending at the Sunlight Foundation
Illinois Redistricting at Illinois House Democrats official website

United States House of Representatives
2012
Illinois